The mining landscape in Zambia covers production of multiple mineral raw materials, including copper, cobalt, gold, nickel, manganese, emeralds, beryllium, myriad gemstones, sulfur, zinc, coal, iron ore, steel, limestone, uranium and other platinum-group metals.  Mining has long been a significant primary sector industry and contributor to the Zambian economy by providing export income, royalty payments and employment.

The geology and mineral resource distribution covers a large portion of Zambia's square area stretching across all 10 provinces of the country. The Geological Survey department has made considerable achievements under its statutory obligations to develop cadastral maps for exploration and mining in the country.

Mineral resource exploitation was originally clustered in centers of mining operations along the Copperbelt, like Konkola and Kitwe. In the last two decades, following the issuance of mining and exploration licences by the Zambia Environmental Management Agency (ZEMA) operational large commercial mines have stretched to the Central, North-Western and Southern Provinces. The sector is expected to see and even more significant boost with the more accommodating taxation regime introduced in 2022 and the flow-on effect of the implementation of the cooperating agreement signed between Zambia and Democratic Republic of the Congo (DRC) for the electric vehicle battery value chain that will require abundant battery metals and battery precursors.

In October 2022, the Zambian Ministry of Mines and Minerals Development gave 90-days amnesty to all illegal miners to legalise operations. It also setup and opened a Cadastre Department and announced that the issuance of mining licenses will be restricted to five per applicant.

Taxes and fees

Research by the Overseas Development Institute on the taxes and fees in the Zambian mining sector during privatisation in the late 1990s and the subsequent boom in copper prices reviewed the taxes and fees for mining and compared it internationally for royalties and corporate income tax in other major mining countries. There were significant differences between countries in how these taxes are calculated and as a result, a comparison of 'headline rates' on their own provide limited insight into how would-be investors perceive the mining sector.

They argued that perceptions offer an alternative and complementary approach to examine how Zambia compares from investors perspective to other countries. Using the Fraser Index component covering taxes and fees specifically, Zambia is in the middle of African countries, on par with South Africa, worse than Botswana, but better than the DRC. Perceptions that the taxes and fees for mining in Zambia is attractive does not necessarily mean the fiscal rates are themselves attractive (and vice versa) as investors tend to view taxes and fees in a broader context of risks to existing framework including its historical volatility and expectations regarding future changes, the possibility of negotiating a deal which is 'better' than the 'official' headline rates through exemptions or allowances, and other factors shaping the economics of the project for example if the geology is very favourable and extraction is low-cost, a firm will be able to accept a higher tax rate.

They claim the diversity of 'drivers' behind investment illustrates the challenges of talking about the 'competitiveness' of a sector's taxes and fees in a narrow sense and different companies will weigh the above factors differently depending on access to low-cost import markets, further complicating an assessment of what an 'average' investor would consider attractive. Government and its development partners have a role to play in promoting policies that make investment more attractive, such as increasing the predictability of the taxes and fees whilst reducing the costs of mining, from infrastructure to skills and quality of geodata.

They found Zambia is collecting and managing revenues from the mining sector, and that Extractive Industries Transparency Initiative has brought welcome transparency to the sector, but has limited scope. Debates have been less about whether revenue is going missing from companies to government, but more on whether Zambia is collecting what it is due. The main challenges therefore are for Zambia lie in reducing the complexity and opacity of mining sector fiscal framework, whilst boosting capacity of government agencies to monitor and collect fiscal contributions from the sector. Addressing these challenges can serve as a win-win for government, industry and development partners, by increasing taxes collected and satisfying those who are calling for greater contributions from the mining sector without further changes to an already-volatile taxes and fees.

They call for a better understanding and an open discussion between the government and mining sector, into what the sector's broader contribution is and what its needs are, to create the space for planning, education, infrastructure beyond the taxes and fees that explicitly take into account the mining sector.

Mopani Copper and Cobalt Mines

*In January 2021. the Zambian Government, through the ZZCM-IH, took on US$1.5 billion in debt to and acquired the 90% shares of Mopani Copper Mines Plc from Carlisa Investments Corporation and became the sole owner of Mopani Copper Mines Plc.

Prior to January 2021, Mopani Copper Mines Plc (Mopani) was a joint venture company based in Kitwe as 95% of its operations are located there, comprising Glencore International AG (73.1%), First Quantum Minerals Ltd. (16.9%) and Zambian Consolidated Copper Mines Limited (10%). Mopani operates the Mufulira mine, smelter, concentrator and copper refinery and the Nkana mine, concentrator and cobalt plant. MCM produced 134,800 tons of copper and 2,040 tons of cobalt in 2003. MCM is investing in a number of oxide copper projects at several of its properties, including an in-situ leaching project at Mufulira and heap leaching at Nkana, and has achieved significant production increases at its underground mining operations in Kitwe and Mufulira. Copper production from internal sources was supplemented by the purchase of some 18,000 tons of copper in high-grade oxide concentrate bought from the Democratic Republic of the Congo. The company aims to rebuild the Mufulira smelter during 2004 and 2005, and also plans to add a new gas collection facility and acid plant at a total cost of US$95 million.

In July 2022, ZCCM-Investment Holdings agreed to offer corporate guarantees of up to US$15.0 million to Atlas Mara Bank Zambia Limited to provide working capital to Mopani Copper Mines (MCM) to inject liquidity for its operations.

In October 2022, Sibanye-Stillwater expressed an interest to acquire Zambia's Mopani Copper Mines, the mine and smelter complex looking for new investors after Glencore sold the asset to the state in January 2021. Zambia's state mining firm ZCCM-IH hired Rothschild in June 2022 to help find a new investor to upgrade and expand it.

Mufulira Mine 
The largest underground mine in Africa, the Mufulira Mine employs 10,000 people; includes a concentrator, a refinery and a smelter; and produces 300,000 tons of copper each year through the process of open stopping. The copper is then taken to the concentrator.

Mufulira Concentrator 
The concentrator crushes ores coming from the Mufulira mine consisting of 46% copper, waters it, and then does the process of flotation so the waste material can be removed.

Mufulira Smelter 
Built in 1927
, the smelter melts the copper mixed with limestone in the Isasmelt furnace. The copper is pressurised by the air, then oxidised, and finally poled. The copper is then taken to the refinery. Mopani completed the third and final phase of upgrading its Mufulira Smelter in the first quarter of 2014.

Mufulira Refinery 
The copper is cast into anodes so the process of electrolysis can take place during refining.

Nkana Mine 
Nkana mine is one of the largest in Africa, a copper mine located 1 km south-west of Kitwe. The mine is underground as well as open pit and is in operation since 1932 and has produced 6,000,000 tons of copper so far. Its reserves underground include 69,000,000 tons of grading, 16,000,000 tons of copper, and 98,000 tons of cobalt. Its resources include 126,000,000 tons of grading, 43,000,000 tons of copper, and 300,000 tons of cobalt. Copper and cobalt mineralisation occur within the ore shale. Copper mineralisation in the deposits changes from mostly chalcopyrite in the South Orebody, to chalcopyrite-bornite in the Central area and to bornite-chalcopyrite at Mindola. Cobalt occurs as carrollite and cobaltiferous pyrite in approximately equal proportions. The mine produces copper and cobalt from three sources: Mindola Shaft, Central Shaft and South Orebody Shaft. Vertical crater retreat is the predominant mining method while sublevel open-stopping and sublevel caving methods are also used. Other metallurgical facilities, under a management contract by an affiliate of the Anglo American Group, include the Nkana smelter (not owned by Mopani), acid plant (not owned by Mopani) and copper refinery (not owned by Mopani). There is extensive mine tailings around this mine.

Nkana Concentrator 
Nkana Concentrator of Mopani mines, located in Kitwe, treats copper-cobalt sulphide ore using a bulk flotation and segregation flotation flowsheet to produce separate copper and cobalt concentrates. Nkana Concentrator is the most important mineral processing unit of Mopani, as it contributes about 65% of cobalt concentrates treated at the Nkana and Chambeshi Cobalt plants to produce high purity cobalt metal.

Nkana and Chambeshi Cobalt Plants 
The cobalt plant treats 65% of the cobalt concentrates to produce high purity cobalt metal. The two cobalt plants are Nkana Cobalt Plant and Chambeshi Cobalt Plant. Glencore has also used acid leaching, a method used to extract ore, in order to effectively extract and produce copper and cobalt.

In May 2022, Mopani Copper Mines announced its intention to restart processing cobalt on account of the rising prices of the metal which it halted more than a decade ago after international prices collapsed.

Mufulira Copper and Cobalt Processing Plant 
In May 2022, Blue Star Resources Ltd, a subsidiary of Blue Star Capital, of the United Arab Emirates in a joint venture with Mopani Copper Mines (MCM) announced plans to invest US$300.0 million into a new Copper and Cobalt processing facility to be located in Mufulira District. The intention is to develop the two historical copper slag dumpsites in the district.

The project is expected to create 300 new permanent jobs and incorporates plans to invest US$2.5 million into each of the three constituencies in the district as part of the JV's Corporate Social Responsibility Program CSRP.

Konkola Copper and Cobalt Mines 

Konkola Copper Mines (KCM) is the largest copper mining company in the country. Although based in Chingola, 15% of its operations—namely Nkana Refinery, Nkana Acid Plants and Nkana Smelter (the largest smelter in the nation) -- are located in Kitwe. The Nkana Smelter is the largest primary copper production plant in Zambia. The plant treats concentrates mainly from Nkana, Nchanga, and Konkola mines, which are wholly owned by KCM to produce up to 150,000 tons of new copper.

*2004 Acquisition Cost

Nkana Smelter 
The smelter produces high grade anodes, which are electrolytically refined. Sulphur dioxide gas produced by the converters is converted into sulphuric acid which is then used at the Tailings Leach Plant in Nchanga for recovering oxide copper. The smelter also produces discard slag from the reverbs that is rich in cobalt which is stored for future reclamation.
This smelter was part of the Konkola Copper Mine's operation at privatisation and has subsequently closed.

Nkana Refinery 
The Nkana Copper Refinery produces electrolytically refined copper in the form of cathodes. The copper meets the LME premium quality grade. The tankhouse has a capacity of about 180,000 tons of finished copper per annum. It has been expanded to accommodate the increased anode production from the Nchanga smelter.

Nkana Acid Plants 
There are two single contact sulphuric acid plants at Smelterco, namely the No. 3 and No. 4 plants. No. 3, the largest, is still operational. The plant has a design capacity of 1,050 tons of acid per day.

Konkola Deep Mine and Concentrator 
A new concentrator was commissioned at Konkola in 2008.

Nchanga Open Pit Mine and Concentrators 
There are two Concentrators. An East and West Mill.

Nchanga Tailings Leach Plant 
The Nchanga Tailings Leach Plant (TLP), one of the largest of its kind in the world, processes tailings from the Nchanga concentrators and stockpiled tailings to produce copper. The TLP extracts copper directly to cathodes from concentrate solution using electrolysis.

Nchanga Smelter 
The Nchanga smelter was commissioned in 2008, incorporating technology from Outotec, Finland. The smelter processes ore from Konkola, Nchanga and other third party concentrates and it has a capacity of 311,000t pa.

Rokana Mine 
Rokana Mine is a mining company that owns Mindola Underground Mine, which mines minerals such as carrollite, chalcopyrite and libethenite. Other minerals mined are bornite, pyrite, chalcocite.

There is extensive mine tailings around this mine.
See Copperbelt Province for the history of the copper-mining industry in this region.

Other mining
There are two small tailings dams right in the city centre. There are also small-scale emerald mines in the area.

Kagem Emerald Mine 

Kagem Emerald Mine, located in Lufwanyama, 45 km southwest of Kitwe, Copperbelt Province.

Kagem Emerald Mine Parent Company Gemfields generated US$330.3 million (ZMW 5.7 billion(i)) Revenue from 1 July 2021 through 30 June 2022 from its 75%-owned Kagem emerald mine, in Zambia; its 75%-owned Montepuez ruby mine, in Mozambique; and Gemfields’ wholly-owned iconic luxury brand Fabergé.

In August 2022, Kagem Mining Limited projected growth in emerald production from the current levels of 37.993 kg to 50.758 kg in the next five years.

Kariba Minerals Ltd 
One of the oldest semi-precious gemstone mines in Zambia, located in Mapatizya, Sinazongwe, Southern Province.

Mine is 100% owned by ZCCM Investment Holdings (ZCCM-IH).

Main product is Amethyst.

Annual production up to 800 tonnes per annum.

Chibuluma Copper Mine 

The Chibuluma (East) ore body was opened up in 1951.

The Chibuluma West ore body (famously known as 7 Shaft) was opened in 1963 and exhausted and closed by 2005.

The Chibuluma Mine South ore body was discovered in 1969.

In 2013, Chibuluma Mine became the first mine in the country to appoint a Zambian National, Jackson Sikamo, as General Manager since the privatisation of the Mines began in 2000.

Luanshya Copper Mine

Baluba Mine 

*2009 Acquisition Cost

Muliashi North Mine and the Muliashi Leach Plant 
The Muliashi Project is an integrated mining and leaching project in Luanshya, Copperbelt Province.

Kalumbila Copper Mine 

Kalumbila Mine, in Kalumbila District, North-Western Province.

Kansanshi Copper and Gold Mine

Kansanshi Mine and Kansanshi Copper Smelter 

Kansanshi mine, in Kansanshi, North-Western Province is the eight largest copper mine in the world, with two open pits.

The Central Bank of Zambia (BOZ) has been purchasing refined gold from Kansanshi Mine from January, 2021 to boost its gold reserves.

In May 2022, First Quantum Minerals approved a US$1.25 billion expansion of the mine following the host government's commitment to a predictable investing environment. The company will invest US$900 million in the processing plant and mine fleet and the remaining US$350 million will be for pre-stripping of the South East Dome pit.

*Original capital construction cost prior to Smelter Facility

**Smelter Facility

In August 2022, FQM reported a 5.2% decline in Quarter on Quarter (QOQ) copper production at Kansanshi Mine. This was a decrease of 2,180 tonnes to result in copper production of 39,719 tonnes.

Lumwana Copper Mine 

Lumwana mine in Lumwana, North-Western Province.

*Inaugurated in April 2009 by Equinox Minerals.

Kasenseli Gold Mine 
In early August 2019, in Mwinilunga, gold deposits were discovered and confirmed by experts from the Ministry of Mines and Mineral Development. The Government, through its subsidiary, ZCCM Investments Holdings (ZCCM-IH), intends to set up a gold mine in Chief Chibwika's area where the gold deposits have been discovered. in March 2020, ZCCM-IH started buying gold from informal miners via ZCCM Gold Company. The extent of the gold reserves is yet to be established and ZCCM Gold Company has injected approximately ZMW 45 million (U$2.2 million, 2020 Spot Exchange rate) for the initial phase of the Kasenseli Gold Mine Project.

The Central Bank of Zambia (BOZ) has been purchasing dore gold from Kasenseli Mine since December, 2020, through the Zambia Gold Company to boost its gold reserves.

Chambishi Copper Mine

Chambishi Main Orebody and Chambishi West Orebody Project 

*Acquisition of Main Orebody by NFCA, ** 2007 Commissioning of the West Orebody

Chambishi Copper Smelter (CCS) 

*Phase I; **Phase II (Expansion)

Chambishi Metals 
Chambishi Metals is a Copper Smelting Plant, located in Kalulushi District, Copperbelt owned and operated by Eurasian Resources Group (ERG). It has been on care and maintenance since January 2020

*As part of Nkana Mine

**Estimate off ERG acquisition of ENYA Holding.

Chambishi Southeast Project

Mwambashi Copper Mine 

In 2018, Sino-Metals Leach Zambia Limited recorded 9,312 tonnes copper production up from 7,100 tonnes in 2017.

Lubambe Copper and Cobalt Mine 

The mine has 200,000 million tonne ore body with a seven (7) million tonnes of copper at a high-grade rate of eight (8) percent and large quantities of cobalt.

Lubambe copper mine was origally a joint venture between African Rainbow Minerals (ARM) and Vale until EMR Capital acquired controlling interest in 2017.

Mimbula Copper Project 
The Mimbula Copper Project is a copper rich oxide and sulphide deposit, located on the outskirts of the town of Chingola on a mining licence held by Moxico Resources’  Zambian unit. Moxico Resources is a development and exploration mining company incorporated in the UK.

Moxico holds an 85% ownership in the license holding company and 15% is held by Moxico's Zambian partners. The mining license was granted in May 2017, with a validity for 25 years.

The British firm plans to invest US$100 million in the mine expansion.

In 2021, Moxico Resources began construction of a 10,000 tonne Leach Pad, Solvent Extraction and Electrowinning Plant. The Plant is expected to be operational by Q2 2022 and is planned to be expanded in phases.

Chitini Gold Project 
It is a Gold exploration Project located halfway between the towns of Kapiri Mposhi and Mkushi, Central Province.

Consolidated Gold Company Zambia (CGCZ) 
Gold processing and refining in Rufunsa District, Lusaka Province.

It is a joint venture between Karma Mining and Mineral Development Company Limited (55%) of Sudan and ZCCM Investments Holdings (ZCCM-IH) (45%) signed in 2020.

The plant was set up at a cost of about US$3.5 million.

The site has 20 gold milling plants with a combined Capacity of 90 kg per annum and a vat leaching plant with capacity 210 kg per annum.

Munali Nickel Mine 

Munali Nickel Mine, in Mazabuka, Southern Province.

In September 2006 following a positive feasibility study, Albidon Limited of Australia obtained permits and approvals to mine Nickel in Mazabuka. The initial project development required more than U$180 million, which was funded by debt financing from Barclays Capital and the European Investment Bank and equity from Albidon Limited, JINCHUAN mining group of China and ZCCM Investment Holdings .

In April 2007, then Zambian President, Levy Mwanawasa launched the Munali Nickel Project at a ground breaking ceremony. The mine would be built and operated under the venture's special purpose vehicle Albidon Zambia Limited (AZL).

AZL commenced mining and production of nickel concentrates in April 2008. Operations were suspended in 2009 because of poor market conditions. From the peak of the Financial crisis of 2007 - 2008 the Mine would struggle for many years.

It was briefly owned and run by JINCHUAN mining group of China from 2010. JINCHUAN would invest U$37 million and employ about 350 workers. However, the mine was shut down again in 2011 due to cashflow problems.

A joint venture Mabiza Resources between Consolidated Nickel Mines Plc of the United kingdom and  CE Mining took ownership in 2014 but delayed capital injection which led the government of Zambia at the time to threaten repossession of the asset. From 2015 the JV has placed in U$50 million investment to reboot operations at the Munali Nickel Mine. The Mine recommenced operations in 2019.

The mine is managed by an all-Zambian management team and currently has a workforce of 380 people, of which 10% are women. Munali currently exports over 10% high quality Nickel concentrate. The mine is expected to generate 3,300t of Ni in 2020, which is anticipated to reach 4,000t in 2021. Although it is billed as a nickel project, Munali also contains commercial quantities of copper, cobalt and platinum group metals (PGMs).

Enterprise Nickel Project 
The Enterprise Nickel Project is an open-pit nickel mine, owned by First Quantum Minerals of Canada, 12 km from the Kalumbila Mine. The Kalumbila Mine processing facility will be used to produce nickel concentrate output.

The Project, estimated at U$275 million, was expected to be operational at the end of 2021 but as of March 2022 was still yet to be operational. In May 2022, First Quantum Minerals approved an additional US$100 million investment the project, which is now expected to commence production in 2023.

In May 2022, following questions about whether FQM held a licence to mine Nickel in Zambia, the company confirmed that it held a valid license up to 2036  to mine and produce Nickel concentrate.

At the projected capacity of 30,000 tons of Nickel annually, FQM is expected to rake in about US$1 billion in revenue annually at May 2022 market prices.

In July 2022, Zambian President Hakainde Hichilema officiated at the ground breaking ceremony for the project.

Kafue Steel Plant 
Located in Kafue, Central Province.

Owned by Universal Mining and Chemical Industries Limited (UMCIL), which is part of the Trade Kings Group of Companies.

UMCIL owns Zambia's first commercial iron ore mine, Sanje Hill, built for a cost of ZMW 70.0 million (US$10 million - 2016 Exchange Rate) and located in Nampundwe, Shibuyunji District, Central Province.

The Steel Plant Capacity is 240,000 metric tonnes of steel per annum.

Maamba Coal Mine 

Maamba Coal Mine, in Maamba, Sinazongwe District, Southern Province.

Maamba is the home to the largest Coal Plant in Zambia at 300MW, built for U$750million and operated by Maamba Collieries Limited (MCL)  which as of 2010 is 100% owned by Nava Bharat Ventures Limited (NVBL) of India.

In 2021, Maamba Collieries Limited announced they were interested in increasing the capacity from 300 to 600MW.

Kabwe Coal Mine 

Broken Hill Coal Mine, in Kabwe, Central Province.

Mutanga Uranium Project 

Mutanga Uranium Project, in Siavonga, Southern Province.

31 km North of Siavonga and north of Lake Kariba, there are 5 main Uranium Deposits: Mutanga, Dibwe, Dibwe East, Njame, and Gwabe explored under The Mutanga Uranium Project. The Canadian Toronto Stock Exchange (TSX) listed GoviEx acquired 100% of the Mutanga Project in 2016. In March 2022, GoviEx announced that the Project is forecast to start production in 2027 and could be the lowest capital intensive uranium project in Africa.

Ndola Lime Company Limited 

Founded in 1931, and located in Masaiti, Copperbelt Province.

100% owned by ZCCM Investments Holdings (ZCCM-IH).

Product: Limestone

Kabundi Manganese Mine 
Kabundi Manganese Mine is located in Kabundi, Serenje, Central Province.

Operated by Kabundi Resources Ltd which is 100% owned by ZCCM Investments Holdings (ZCCM-IH) and encompasses a Large-Scale Exploration Licence for exploration for commodities which include manganese, cobalt, copper, zinc, limestone and precious minerals.

Investment: US$2.4 million in a manganese plant.

Capacity: 20,000 tonnes of manganese per annum.

Kampumba – Manganese Project 
Located in Kapiri Mposhi, Central Province.

Ndabala – Manganese Project 
Covers the Mansa-Chipili  and Mkushi-Serenje and belts in Luapula and Central Provinces respectively.

Sable Zinc Refinery 
Location: Kabwe, Central Province.

Acquired by Jubilee Metals Group of South Africa for US$12.0 million in 2019.

Capacity: 8,000 tonnes per annum (tpa) of Zinc, 1,500tpa of Vanadium and 15,000tpa of Lead.

Star Zinc Project 
Small scale but high-grade deposit  of Zinc located near Lusaka, Lusaka Province. In March 2021, Siege Mining acquired the large scale exploration license and project ownership for US$750,000 from Galileo Resources of the United Kingdom. Galileo Resources will also be paid a royalty by Siege Mining on potential zinc sales from the project, based on the zinc grade.

Kashitu Zinc Project 
Location: Kabwe, Central Province.

Owned by Galileo Resources.

Potential exists for a large scale mine of medium to low grade Zinc.

Mutinta Jewellery - Diamond Processing Plant 
US$3.2 million diamond and gemstone processing plant, with a capacity of 15,000-25,000 carats per annum.

Other Projects

Arc Minerals and Anglo American plc JV 
In May 2022, Arc Minerals and Anglo American plc formed a joint venture for copper exploration in the North Western Province of Zambia.

Luansobe Copper Project 
In December 2021, Galileo Resources  entered into a US$500,000 joint venture with Zambian firm Statunga Investments Limited for small scale exploration licence 15 km to the northwest of Mopani's Mufulira Mine site.

Reports suggest the potential for significant copper resources are present.

Mokambo copper mine

In August 2012 Chinese firm Changfa Mineral Resources acquired the Mokambo Copper mine project in Mufulira on the Democratic Republic of Congo border and it is expected to create around 3,000 new jobs when it begins full-scale operations in 2012.

Mwashia Resources Limited 
In August 2021, Mwashia Resources Limited of Kitwe entered into a JV with Luangwa Minerals Ltd, a subsidiary of Tertiary Minerals plc of the United Kingdom. Luangwa Minerals Ltd entered into an option agreement with Mwashia Resources Ltd to acquire up to a 90% joint venture interest in the Jack's Hill Project and four other large exploration licences in Zambia considered prospective for copper. The Jack's Hill Project is located in Luanshya, Copperbelt Province.

In October 2021, Mwashia Resources Limited, obtained approval from the Zambia Environmental Management Agency (ZEMA) after meeting the requirements under the ZEMA Act Number 12 of 2011 and the Environmental Impact Assessment requirements to explore for copper in Kapiri Mposhi, Central Province.

In May 2022, the company commenced explorations for a large scale copper mine with the aid of mining exploration company Geo Quest of Lusaka and initial drilled samples presented between 1.5 and 2.5 percent grade of copper at a sub-surface depth of less than 60 meters.

Project Roan Concentrator 
Located in Luanshya, Copperbelt.

Copper and Cobalt Project owned by Jubilee Minerals of South Africa.

By May 2022 the project had created approximately 800 permanent jobs.

In June 2022, Jubilee Metals commissioned its Cobalt Refining Circuit.

In September 2022, Jubilee Metals announced that its Southern Copper Refining Plant attained its nameplate capacity of 110 tonnes per hour.

Mukai and Mushima North Projects 
Located in North-Western Province

In September 2022, Tertiary Minerals signed a cooperation agreement with  First Quantum Minerals (FQM) to explore the two projects.

Deep-South Resources Projects 
As of October 2022, Deep-South Resources a Toronto Stock Exchange (TSXV: DSM) listed mineral exploration and development company is undertaking exploration work at its three newly acquired large-scale copper exploration licences in the centre of the Zambian Copperbelt. The Projects include:

 Luanshya West Project
 Chililabombwe Project
 Mpongwe Project

Environmental issues

The Broken Hill Mine, which occupies a 2.5 km2 site just 1 km south-west of Kabwe town centre, is now closed.  Metals are still foraged from old tailings by locals, but it is expected an industrious cleanup by a foreign company will commence shortly this year.  A study by the Blacksmith Institute found Kabwe to be one of the ten worst polluted and deadliest places in the world due mostly to heavy metal (mostly Zinc, Cadmium and Lead) tailings making their way into the local water supply.

See also
Mineral industry of Africa
Economy of Zambia
List of Companies in Zambia

References

External links

Ministry of Mines and Mineral Development
http://www.zda.org.zm/?q=content/mining-sector
https://miningforzambia.com/a-concentrated-mining-sector/
https://www.mmmd.gov.zm/
http://mines.org.zm/